2011 FC Tampa Bay season was the second in the club's existence and the first in the NASL.

Review 
FC Tampa Bay transitioned from the temporary USSF Division 2 Professional League to the new North American Soccer League, a second division league, and also changed their home pitch, as they moved across Tampa Bay to Al Lang Stadium in St. Petersburg from George M. Steinbrenner Field in Tampa. Former original Rowdie Ricky Hill was named the club's manager in January 2011.

After winning only 2 of their first 10 matches, the club rebounded to finish 3rd in the league table and qualified for the NASL playoffs. They were upset by eventual league champion NSC Minnesota Stars in the quarterfinals by a score of 1–0. Tampa Bay won their second straight Coastal Cup, by taking three out of four matches against their Florida Derby rivals, Fort Lauderdale. Another highlight was a 1–0 mid-season friendly win over the Bolton Wanderers of the English Premier League at Al Lang Stadium. The Rowdies (along with the rest of the NASL) did not participate in the 2011 U.S. Open Cup due to late provisional sanctioning by the USSF.

Results

Preseason

NASL

Friendlies

Playoffs

Club

First team roster 
as of August 25, 2011

Coaching staff
  Perry Van der Beck - Executive Vice President, Technical Director, and Director of Player Development
  Ricky Hill - Head Coach
  Lee Cohen - Director of Operations
  David Hayes - Assistant Coach
  Slobodan Janjuš - Goalkeeper Coach
  James Faylo - Head Athletic Trainer
  Harris McIlwain - Team Physician
  Seth Gasser - Team Physician

NASL

Standings

Results summary

Ponce De Leon Cup 
The Ponce De Leon Cup was a fan-based derby and trophy that was created in 2006. Participants were originally United Soccer Leagues first division teams (later USSF-D2, then NASL teams) based in lands that Spanish explorer Juan Ponce de León had visited; namely Florida and Puerto Rico. It was awarded to the club with the best record in league games versus the other participants.

Regular season

Honors
NASL Fair Play Award

Individual honors
NASL Best XI
 Pascal Millien, Mike Ambersley

References

External links
FC Tampa Bay

2011
Tampa Bay
Tampa
FC Tampa Bay
Sports in St. Petersburg, Florida
21st century in St. Petersburg, Florida